Musa Nizam (born 8 September 1990) is a Turkish footballer who plays as a defender for TFF Second League club Isparta 32 SK.

References

External links
 
 Guardian Stats Centre
 
 

1990 births
Sportspeople from Antalya
Living people
Turkish footballers
Turkey under-21 international footballers
Association football defenders
Antalyaspor footballers
Denizlispor footballers
Trabzonspor footballers
Gaziantepspor footballers
Akhisarspor footballers
Kocaelispor footballers
Süper Lig players
TFF First League players
TFF Second League players